Andalucia incarcerata is a species of Excavata.

It used to be known as Jakoba incarcerata but is currently placed in the genus Stygiella Pánek, Táborský & Čepička 2015 as Stygiella incarcerata (Bernard, Simpson & Patterson 2000) Pánek, Táborský & Čepička 2015.

References

Jakobids